The New Jersey Saints were one of the founding teams in the Eagle Pro Box Lacrosse League (renamed in 1989 to the Major Indoor Lacrosse League, and then again in 1998 to the National Lacrosse League). They played at the Brendan Byrne Arena in East Rutherford, New Jersey. The Saints won the 1988 Eagle Pro championship. After the 1988 season, they moved to Long Island, New York and became the New York Saints.

Awards and honors

All time record

Playoff results

Championships

External links
Indoor Lacrosse; N.J. Saints Win In Season Opener, New York Times, January 4, 1988

Defunct National Lacrosse League teams
Lacrosse clubs established in 1987
Sports clubs disestablished in 1988
Lacrosse teams in New Jersey
Major Indoor Lacrosse League teams
Sports in East Rutherford, New Jersey
1987 establishments in New Jersey
1988 disestablishments in New Jersey